Steven Scott (born March 4, 1984) is a Canadian professional wrestler, currently signed with Impact Wrestling, under the ring name Crazzy Steve, where he is a former Impact World Tag Team Champion. He also wrestles on the independent circuit for various other promotions.

Professional wrestling career

Independent circuit (2003–2014)
Scott competed in the independent circuit, including Great Canadian Wrestling (GCW) where he is a one time GCW Tag Team Champion with Gutter. He also won the Maximum Pro Wrestling's Georgian Bay Heavyweight Championship defeating El Tornado on September 10, 2011. On November 26, 2013, Scott faced Gabriel Saint for the ESW Interstate Championship but failed to win the title.

Impact Wrestling

The Menagerie (2014–2015)

In April 2014, Scott made his debut for Total Nonstop Action Wrestling (TNA) under his Crazzy Steve ring name and became a part of Knux's The Menagerie stable, which also included The Freak and Rebel. On the May 8 episode of Impact Wrestling, The Menagerie made their televised debut with Knux defeating Kazarian in Knux's return match. The following week, Steve fought Kazarian to a no contest after Steve pants'd the referee in his in-ring debut. On June 15, at Slammiversary XII, Steve took part in a 6-way Ladder match for the TNA X Division Championship which was won by Sanada. On the July 17 episode of Impact Wrestling, Steve took part in a Gauntlet Match for the X Division Championship which was won by Austin Aries. On the January 23, 2015, episode of Impact Wrestling, Steve competed in the Feast or Fired match, but failed to retrieve a briefcase. The group disbanded after Knux left TNA on May 19, 2015.

During October and November (taped in July), Steve competed in the new World Title Series tournament as a member of "Group Wildcard", where he finished 4th in the group, failing to win any of the matches that took place the following weeks. At One Night Only: Live!, Steve turned heel when he attacked Tigre Uno after he was eliminated in a match for the X Division Championship.

Decay (2016–2017)

On the January 26, 2016, episode of Impact Wrestling, Steve, Abyss and Rosemary attacked TNA World Tag Team Champions The Wolves and stole their titles, thus forming a new stable called Decay. On March 19, Decay defeated Beer Money, Inc. to win the TNA World Tag Team Championship, marking Steve's first TNA championship. On the May 3 episode of Impact Wrestling, Rosemary spit green mist into his face before Abyss's match with James Storm, giving him the ability to speak for the first time in TNA. The following week on Impact Wrestling, Decay defeated Jeff Hardy and James Storm to retain the titles.  At Slammiversary, Decay retained the titles against The BroMans (Robbie E and Jessie Godderz). On October 2 at Bound for Glory, Decay lost the titles to The Broken Hardys in a match dubbed "The Great War." On the October 6 episode of Impact Wrestling, The Broken Hardys defeated Decay in a Wolf Creek Cage Match. On December 15, during special episode Total Nonstop Deletion, Decay competed in Tag Team Apocalypto where The Hardys retained the titles.

On the January 5, 2017, episode of Impact Wrestling, after defeating The Helms Dynasty, Decay's celebration was cut short by the sudden arrival of the Death Crew Council (DCC), who ambushed Decay by smashing beer bottles over their heads, with Bram issuing a threat to Rosemary afterwards. On January 6, at One Night Only: Live, Decay would ambush DCC after James Storm's victory over Jessie Godderz, misting Storm and Bram, incapacitating them while Abyss chokeslammed Kingston. On the January 12 episode of Impact Wrestling, the match between Decay and DCC ended in a double count-out. On the January 19 episode of Impact Wrestling, Steve competed in a Race for the Case match, but failed to get a case. On the April 27 episode of Impact Wrestling, Decay lost to The Latin American Xchange (Santana and Ortiz), and this would be Steve's last match for the company. On April 20, 2017, Scott announced his departure from Impact Wrestling.

Return to independent circuit (2017–2020) 
On June 17, 2017, WWE reported that Steve was attending a tryout at their Performance Center. He was not signed, however. Following his departure from Impact, Steve announced that would be competing for various promotions on the independent scene. At NWA New Year's Clash Pop-Up Event, Steve defeated Sam Shaw to become the new Tried N' True (TNT) Heavyweight Champion. In January 2019, Crazzy Steve had a one-off appearance at IMPACT's TV taping.

Ohio Valley Wrestling (2018–2019) 

On August 29, 2018, Steve made his debut in Ohio Valley Wrestling, reuniting with former tag team partner Abyss on weekly TV series. On September 1 at the OVW TV tapings, Steve and Amon defeated Justin Smooth and Randall Floyd in a dark match. On the September 8 episode of OVW TV, Steve and Amon defeated Dimes and KTD. On the September 15 episode of OVW TV, Crazzy Steve lost to Randall Floyd in the first round of the Grand title tournament. On the September 22 episode of OVW TV, Steve and Amon defeated Dimes and Eddie Knight in a dark match. On the September 29 episode of OVW TV, Steve, Amon and The Void (Chace Destiny, Houdini & Nigel Winters) defeated The Bro Godz (Colton Cage & Dustin Jackson), Ashton Cove, Big Zo and Randall Floyd in a dark match. On the October 6 episode of OVW TV, Steve and Amon lost to Justin Smooth and Randall Floyd. On the October 20 episode of OVW TV, The Void (Steve, Amon, Chace Destiny, Houdini and Nigel Winters) lost to Justin Smooth, Michael Hayes, Randall Floyd, Randy Royal and Rocco Bellagio in a dark match. On the October 27 episode of OVW TV, Steve and Amon lost to The War Kings (Crimson and Jax Dane). On the November 17 episode of OVW TV, The Void (Steve, Amon, Chace Destiny, Houdini and Nigel Winters) defeated The Bro Godz (Colton Cage & Dustin Jackson), Big Zo, Brandon Wolfe and Dimes. On the November 30 episode of OVW TV, Steve defeated Randall Floyd. On the December 8 episode of OVW TV, Steve and Amon defeated Randall Floyd and Rocco Bellagio. On the December 14 episode of OVW TV, The Void (Amon, Chace Destiny, Crazzy Steve, Houdini and Nigel Winters) lost to Big Zo, Justin Smooth, Randall Floyd, Randy Royal and Rocco Bellagio in a tag team steel cage match.

On the January 5, 2019 episode of OVW TV, Steve competed in a rumble match which was won by Melvin Maximus. On the January 12 episode of OVW TV, Steve and Amon lost to King's Ransom (Leonis Khan and Maximus Khan). On the January 26 episode of OVW TV, Steve and Amon defeated Ashton Cove and William Lutz. On the February 2 episode of OVW TV, Steve and Amon competed to a no contest in a match against The Void (Chace Destiny and Nigel Winters). On the March 2 episode of OVW TV, Steve lost to Chace Destiny in a casket match.

Return to Impact Wrestling (2020–present) 
On April 21, 2020, Steve re-signed with the company. Steve made his re-debut in a six-man tag team match with Tommy Dreamer and Rhino against Ohio Versus Everything (Dave Crist, Jake Crist and Madman Fulton) at Rebellion where Steve's team was victorious. On the May 19 episode of Impact!, he defeated Dave Crist in a singles match. On the July 28 episode of Impact!, Steve joined a bunch of wrestlers in the reality show Wrestle House. He lost against Acey Romero in a match where the winner gets to sleep in the ring. During Night 2 of Emergence, Steve defeated Johnny Swinger in a Blindfold match, where the loser had to dress like the winner the next week. On the September 1 episode of Impact!, he and the rest of the Wrestle House cast returned to the Impact Zone during Knockouts Champion Deonna Purrazzo's Black Tie Affair. On October 24, at Bound for Glory, he competed in the Call Your Shot Gauntlet match, which was won by Rhino. On the November 24 episode of Impact!, Steve disguised himself as Suicide and defeated Rohit Raju to get a shot at his X Division Championship, but lost the following week.

On the January 12, 2021 episode of Impact!, Steve prevented Kaleb with a K from interfering in his former ally Rosemary's match against Tenille Dashwood, which allowed Rosemary to win the match, thus marking a reunion of Decay. This led to Decay reuniting at the Hard To Kill pay-per-view and winning against Dashwood and Kaleb in an intergender tag team match. On July 31, at Homecoming, Steve teamed with Rosemary to compete in a tournament to crown a Homecoming King and Queen. They defeated Fallah Bahh and Tasha Steelz in the first round, Tommy Dreamer and Rachael Ellering in the semifinals, but lost to Deonna Purrazzo and Matthew Rehwoldt in the final. In October, Steve entered a tournament to determine the inaugural Impact Digital Media Champion, where he defeated Hernandez in the first round but lost to Jordynne Grace in the final at Bound for Glory.

Personal life 
Scott is legally blind as a result of congenital bilateral cataracts; his vision was not improved  by the cataracts' surgical removal.

Championships and accomplishments

Canadian Wrestling Revolution
CWR Open Weight Championship (1 time)
CWR Pan-American Championship (1 time)
Great Canadian Wrestling
GCW Tag Team Championship (2 times) – with Gutter (1) and Jake O'Reilly
Fighting Spirit Pro Wrestling
FSPW Internet Championship (1 time)
Living Legends Wrestling
LLW Light Heavyweight Championship (1 time)
Maximum Pro Wrestling
MPW Georgian Bay Heavyweight Championship (1 time)
Neo Spirit Pro Wrestling
NSPW Independent Championship (1 time)
PSPW Internet Championship (1 time)
Old School Championship Wrestling
OSCW Intercontinental Championship (1 time, current)
Pro Wrestling Illustrated
Ranked No. 68 of the top 500 singles wrestlers in the PWI 500 in 2017
Renegade Wrestling Alliance
RWA Tag Team Champion (1 time, current) - with Gory
Total Nonstop Action Wrestling
TNA World Tag Team Championship (1 time) – with Abyss
TNA World Cup (2015) – with Jeff Hardy, Davey Richards, Rockstar Spud, Gunner and Gail Kim
Tried-N-True Pro
Tried-N-True Championship (1 time, current)

References

External links

Impact Wrestling profile
Online World of Wrestling profile
Cagematch profile

1984 births
21st-century professional wrestlers
Canadian male professional wrestlers
Living people
Sportspeople from Ontario
Sportspeople with a vision impairment
Canadian expatriate professional wrestlers in the United States
TNA/Impact World Tag Team Champions